Wimme Saari (also known as just Wimme, b. 1959, Kelottijärvi, Enontekiö) is a Finnish Sami yoiker. Wimme Saari combines traditional Sami singing with his own improvisations, usually to a techno-ambient accompaniment by members of Finnish electronic group RinneRadio. Wimme has also appeared on the albums of other bands or musicians, for instance Hedningarna, Nits or Hector Zazou.

Awards
In 1996, Wimme was awarded the Áillohaš Music Award, a Sámi music award conferred by the municipality of Kautokeino and the Kautokeino Sámi Association to honor the significant contributions the recipient or recipients has made to the diverse world of Sámi music.

Partial discography

Related Wimme Recordings
RinneRadio – Joik Aani (1992)
Hedningarna – Trä (1994)
Hedningarna – Hippjokk (1997)
Nits – alankomaat (1998)

Wimme recordings
Wimme (1995)
Gierran (1997)
Cugu (2000)
Bárru (2003)
Gapmu / Instinct (2003) – (entirely a cappella)
Mun (2009)

Also appears on
Beginner's Guide to Scandinavia (3CD, Nascente 2011)

References

External links
 Official website

1959 births
Living people
Áillohaš Music Award winners
Finnish Sámi musicians
20th-century Finnish male singers
21st-century Finnish male singers